Crompton is a community in West Warwick, Rhode Island, United States. It is named after Samuel Crompton, inventor of the spinning mule.

The Crompton Mill was set up in 1807, on the east bank of the Pawtuxet River, and is thought to be the first stone mill built in Rhode Island. The original structure still stands on the original site, although extensive modifications to add a further two stories by 1881 were carried out, allowing for the production of corduroy and print cloth at the site.

Crompton is home to Old St. Mary Church, the oldest Roman Catholic church building in the state of Rhode Island, built in 1844.

References

Villages in Kent County, Rhode Island
West Warwick, Rhode Island
Villages in Rhode Island